Máire Aoife Comerford (2 June 1893 - 15 December 1982) was an Irish republican from County Wexford who witnessed central events in 1916-23 and remained a committed supporter of Cumann na mBan until her death. Her memoir of the Irish Revolution, On Dangerous Ground, was published posthumously in 2021.

Early life

Comerford was born Mary Eva Comerford on 2 June 1893 in Rathdrum, County Wicklow. Her parents were James Comerford, a flour and corn miller who owned the Comerford Mill, and Eva Mary Esmonde. She had two brothers (Thomas and Alexander) and one sister (Dympna). Her maternal grandfather, Thomas Esmonde had been awarded a V.C. for bravery in the Crimean war in 1854. On his return to Ireland he joined the Royal Irish Constabulary and was promoted to Deputy Chief Inspector. 

Her father died when she was 16 and in 1911 she was sent to London to a secretarial school. During this time she stayed in the Ladies Club in Eccles Place. She returned to Ireland to live with her mother in the home of her uncle in Wexford, T. L. Esmonde. Around 1915, her mother rented a house in Courtown, Co Wexford to set up a school.

1916-1922
Comerford was in Dublin during the outbreak of the Easter Rising in Dublin and volunteered to aid Countess Markievicz in St Stephen's Green, but was turned away. She carried despatches for the GPO garrison. She returned to Gorey after the Rising and joined the local Sinn Féin branch where she worked alongside Sean Etchingham.

Comerford supported the prisoners who had been taken in 1916 and the reordering of the Sinn Féin party from 1917. She returned to Dublin shortly before the 1918 General Election, where she worked on Roger Sweetman's election campaign. Sinn Féin won a majority in the election. On 21 January 1919 she attended the Round Room at the Mansion House, witnessing the creation of the First Dail by the 27 TDs present. 

Comerford supported the IRA in the Dublin area during the Irish War of Independence. She also helped to run the Irish White Cross, led by the Quaker James Douglas, which aimed to assist civilian war victims by raising money in the United States.

Civil War
Before the Irish Civil War of 1922-23, Cumann na mBan had voted by 419-63 against the terms of the Anglo-Irish Treaty and wanted to maintain the Irish Republic. However this vote was taken after the Treaty had been approved by the Dáil on 7 January. 

In June 1922 she managed to escape from the Four Courts during the Battle of Dublin. The war further split the Sinn Féin movement, and in 1923 Comerford was arrested and held at the women's section of Mountjoy Prison. She had been arrested for possession of a revolver. She was held in solitary confinement for three months "because of her defiant attitude". 

In later years she felt that Éamon de Valera's suggestion in America in 1919-20 that Ireland's future relationship to Britain would be about the same as that of Cuba to the USA had started the mentality of compromise that had led to the Treaty being signed in 1921.

Republican politics
Following the Civil War, Comerford supported Éamon de Valera and his abstentionist Republican candidates, but split with him (as did Mary MacSwiney) when he entered the Dáil in 1927. In 1926 he had established the Fianna Fáil party, which drew off a number of Cumann na mBan supporters and weakened it thereafter. Comerford remained a member of what was from then on generally seen as a committed group which would not compromise in terms of politics on constitutional matters. 

In 1935-65, despite their political differences, she worked as a journalist at De Valera's newspaper The Irish Press. During "The Emergency", the Irish Directorate of Military Intelligence was concerned about The Irish Press having Comerford, Brian O'Neill, R. M. Fox, Geoffrey Coulter, and Tom Mullins on its staff.

Later life 
In 1967 Comerford worked on the restoration of the Tailors' Hall in Dublin, which had housed Wolfe Tone's nascent republican parliament in the 1790s, with the Irish Georgian Society. In 1969 her book The First Dáil was published by Joe Clarke. 

In the 1970s and up to her death she supported the Provisional Irish Republican Army war in Northern Ireland, in particular its hunger strike campaign.  In 1976 she was interviewed for the 'Curious Journey' television documentary with other survivors of the 1914-23 period These interviews were later published as a book Curious Journey. An Oral History of Ireland's Unfinished Revolution (1982).

Comerford worked as a journalist until her retirement in the 1960s. She never married.

Death and legacy 
Comerford died on 15 December 1982, aged 89. She was buried in Mount Saint Benedict Cemetery in Gorey, Co Wexford.

In 2021, her memoir was edited by Hilary Dully and published by Lilliput Press as On Dangerous Ground, a Memoir of the Irish Revolution.

Archive
Comerford's papers are held at two Dublin libraries: 
 NLI: Ms. 24896
 UCD: IE UCDA LA18

Bibliography 

 The First Dáil January 21st 1919 (1969). Dublin: Joe Clarke.
 Curious Journey. An Oral History of Ireland's Unfinished Revolution (1982). London: Hutchinson. (Interviews with Tom Barry, Maire Comerford, Seán Harling, Seán Kavanagh, David Neligan, John L O'Sullivan, Joseph Sweeney, Brighid Lyons Thornton and Martin Walton)
 On Dangerous Ground, a Memoir of the Irish Revolution (2021). Edited by Hillary Dully. Dublin: Lilliput Press.

References

See also
http://www.corkcity.ie/news/archivednews2006/mainbody,172,en.html 
Her opinion on the death of Michael Collins
Info on the Tailors' Hall

People of the Irish Civil War (Anti-Treaty side)
1892 births
1982 deaths
People from Gorey
The Irish Press people
Women in war in Ireland
Women in war 1900–1945
People of the Easter Rising
Cumann na mBan members